Trichophyton mentagrophytes is a species in the fungal genus Trichophyton. It is one of three common fungi which cause ringworm in companion animals. It is also the second-most commonly isolated fungus causing tinea infections in humans, and the most common or one of the most common fungi that cause zoonotic skin disease (i.e., transmission of mycotic skin disease from species to species). Trichophyton mentagrophytes is being frequently isolated from dogs, cats, rabbits, guinea pigs and other rodents, though at least some genetic variants possess the potential of human-to-human transmission, e.g. Type VII and Type VIII. Particular genetic variants of the fungus have distinct geographic ranges.

Drug resistance
In T. mentagrophytes, antifungal drug resistance is mainly associated with Type VIII isolates. Drug-resistant T. mentagrophytes strains have been found in many places across Asia and Europe. India is the most affected country, with the rate of microbiological resistance to terbinafine estimated at 11.4%. There are also reports on terbinafine-resistant Type II isolates from Japan and Denmark.

Molecular strain typing
For studies on the epidemiology of T. mentagrophytes, two molecular strain typing techniques are available. The first one is based upon amplification of nontranscribed spacer of ribosomal DNA, and the second one involves a comparison of internal transcribed spacer sequences within defined boundaries.

Nomenclature
Along with closely related T. interdigitale, the species has been traditionally treated as a part of polyphyletic assemblage, named "T. mentagrophytes sensu lato". From 1999 to 2017 the two species have been collectively referred to as T. interdigitale, while the name "T. mentagrophytes" has been used for current T. quinckeanum. Trichophyton interdigitale seems to be strictly anthropophilic, and is associated with foot and nail infections.

Mating and meiosis
Trichophyton mentagrophytes is capable of  mating.  This species is also able to undergo meiosis.  The haploid chromosome complement of T. mentagrophytes is four. The fusion of haploid nuclei (karyogamy) preceding meiosis occurs in the penultimate cell of a typical crozier, an anatomical feature of the sexual phase of many fungi in the Division Ascomycota.

References

Arthrodermataceae